Taman Ungku Tun Aminah (Jawi: تامن اوڠكو تون امينه; , abbreviated as "TUTA") is a suburb in Skudai, Iskandar Puteri, Johor Bahru District, Johor, Malaysia. It was erected on 1980s after Sultanah Tun Aminah.

Transportation

The suburb houses the Taman Ungku Tun Aminah bus and taxi terminal. The area is accessible by Muafakat Bus route P-202. or by Causeway Link route T32 from Johor Bahru Sentral railway station to Bandar Selesa Jaya.

Shopping

Tasek Sentral
 :ms:Paradigm Mall
Sutera Mall

References

Iskandar Puteri
Populated places in Johor